The second series of the children's British cooking programme Matilda and the Ramsay Bunch aired from 6 May to 12 August 2016, it was announced that the series was renewed by CBBC for a second series. The Second series follows the Ramsay family on their summer holidays in L.A, Cornwall and London where Matilda Ramsay (Tilly) cooks her favourite meals and foods whiles the rest of the family go out and about Tilly also challenges her family to do challenges in each show.

The second series of Matilda and the Ramsay Bunch was moved from its Tuesday evening time slot to a Friday and would air all 15 episodes at the same time unlike the first series witch had many different time slots. Episode 1 of Matilda and the Ramsay Bunch was released on BBC Iplayer on 29 April 2016 a week before original broadcast. Episode 1 was then also shown on CBBC on 6 May 2016.

Production

Development
It was announced in August 2015 that Matilda and the Ramsay Bunch would be renewed for a 15x15 minute second series to air in 2016, unlike the first series where the show was filmed in L.A the second series was filmed in L.A, Cornwall and London at all three Ramsay family homes throughout the summer holidays. The second series saw many guest stars including James Cordon, Cruz Beckham and The Vamps.

Filming
When the second series was confirmed, it was also reviled that filming for the series again took place during the U.K summer holidays in 2015 for April 2016 release. Unlike the first series where it was all filmed in L.A for the third series the Ramsay family took holidays in L.A, Cornwall and London. It was all filmed over 6 weeks same as the first series.

Guest starring
The second series saw many guest stars throughout the series, some of the celebrities where interviewed by the Ramsay's and some performed. This was the first series to introduce guest starring and it will return in series three.

Episodes

Ratings

BBC Store
After the second series had finished all 15 episodes were available to buy online on the BBC Store. From 1 November 2017 all episodes bought would be lost due to BBC Store being closed down.

References

External links
 
 

2016 British television seasons